The Little Adventuress is a 1938 American adventure film directed by D. Ross Lederman.

Cast
 Edith Fellows as Pinky Horton
 Richard Fiske as Dick Horton
 Julie Bishop as Helen Gould (as Jacqueline Wells)
 Cliff Edwards as Handy
 Virginia Howell as Aunt Hattie
 Harry C. Bradley as Henry Lowell
 Charles Waldron as Herkimer Gould
 Kenneth Harlan as Tom Eagan

References

External links
 

1938 films
1938 adventure films
American adventure films
American black-and-white films
1930s English-language films
Films directed by D. Ross Lederman
Columbia Pictures films
1930s American films